Vem vill bli miljonär? (English translation: Who wants to be a millionaire?) was a Swedish game show based on the original British format of Who Wants to Be a Millionaire?. The show was hosted by Bengt Magnusson. The main goal of the game was to win 10 million kronor by answering 15 multiple-choice questions correctly. There were three lifelines - fifty fifty, phone a friend and ask the audience. Vem vill bli miljonär? was broadcast from 21 January 2000 until 13 June 2003. It was shown on the Swedish TV station TV4.

When a contestant got the fifth question correct, he left with at least 10,000 SEK. When a contestant got the tenth question correct, he left with at least 320,000 SEK. Since August 2005 a modified version called Postkodmiljonären has been broadcast, with more focus on the sponsoring lottery.

Money tree

References

Who Wants to Be a Millionaire?
Swedish game shows